The Battle of Jugla was a defensive battle of the Russian Republic's 12th Army of the First World War from 1 to 5 September 1917. It was part of the German offensive called the Battle of Riga or Schlacht um Riga. The main objective for the Russian 12th Army was to prevent the German 8th Army from forcing the Daugava river and besieging Russian troops in Riga.

The battle took place at the banks of the river Mazā Jugla. One of the main units involved was a brigade of 6,000 Latvian Riflemen from the 2nd Latvian Rifles under the command of Ansis Lielgalvis.

Background
German generals began to prepare for the battle as early as December 1916. It was decided to force the Daugava River at Ikšķile and quickly advance north and northwest. This had two main intended purposes: to cause the surrender of the Russian 12th Army and to capture Riga. This would also afford the benefit of straightening the German front line, which would allow a number of German divisions to be freed up and sent to France, where ultimately the fate of the war would be determined.

According to Buttar, "Julius Riemann's VI Corps would advance along the east bank of the Daugava towards Riga, Albert von Berrer's LI Corps would drive northest to intercept the retreating Russians and prevent their withdrawal, and Hugo von Kathen's XXIII Reserve Corps would guard against any Russian attacks from the east."

Battle

On the morning of 1 September 1917, after a three-hour artillery bombardment, the Germans launched the assault and began the construction of three wooden pontoon bridges over the river Daugava near Ikšķile. 1159 German artillery guns fully suppressed 66 opposing Russian guns. Artillery fire forced Russian 186th Division to withdraw from the right bank of the Daugava, thus allowing the Germans to successfully cross the river. The commander of the Russian 12th Army, General Parsky, ordered the XLIII Army corps to counterattack the German bridgehead and deployed for this task four infantry divisions as well as the 2nd Latvian Rifleman Brigade.

The Russian force, including the Latvian brigade, received orders in the afternoon of 1 September and started to move from Ropaži against the Germans. The 5th Zemgale Latvian Riflemen Regiment reached fortified German positions along the river Jugla in the late afternoon. After heavy shelling at midday of 2 September by German artillery, the German attack against Latvian Rifleman positions started. Intense fighting started along the entire 14 km front line of the bridgehead. The Germans used aviation, flame throwers and gas attacks but despite this, the Latvian Riflemen managed to hold back the German advance for 26 hours. This allowed the 12th Russian Army (including 1st Latvian Rifleman Brigade which still was in the Tīrelis swamp positions near Olaine) to safely withdraw from Riga.

On 3 September, The Germans entered Riga unopposed. However, according to Buttar, "There was almost no resistance when the Germans secured crossings over the Daugava, and almost no counterattacks at any stage - XLIII Corps fought doggedly for a day to hold up the German advance..." The Latvian Rifle Brigade had suffered particularly, losing more than half its strength, but XLIII Corps had bought enough time for at least the personnel of Twelfth Army to escape. However, "...much of Parsky's artillery was abandoned..."  German losses were 4200 compared to the Russian 25,000.

Aftermath

The Battle of Jugla inflicted heavy casualties upon the Latvian rifleman units. The 5th Zemgale and 6th Tukums regiments lost more than half of their order of battle. The 7th Bauskas and 8th Valmiera regiments also suffered heavy casualties. Riga had been lost to the advancing Germans. However, an important objective had been accomplished, as the Russian 12th Army had managed to withdraw intact from Riga and managed to safely retreat to Vidzeme.

For the German, according to Prit Buttar, "It was a major gain, for a variety of reasons: Riga was a major industrial centre; it was one of the largest cities in the fast-collapsing former Russian Empire with a large non-Russian population; and it moved the front line directly towards Petrograd."

See also
 Georg Bruchmüller

References 

1917 in Latvia
Jugla
Jugla
September 1917 events